Long Qian (1913–1992) other names Long Qiunian, Long Zhong and Long Youming, was a People's Liberation Army major general and People's Republic of China politician. He was born in Yongxin County, Jiangxi Province. He was a member of the Chinese Workers' and Peasants' Red Army and the New Fourth Army. He was a member of the standing committee of the Chinese Communist Party Zhejiang Party Committee and governor of Zhejiang Province.

Reference

1913 births
1992 deaths
People's Republic of China politicians from Jiangxi
Chinese Communist Party politicians from Jiangxi
People's Liberation Army generals from Jiangxi
Governors of Zhejiang
Political office-holders in Zhejiang
Politicians from Ji'an
People of the Republic of China